Eulepidotis zebra is a moth of the family Erebidae first described by Jérôme Barbut and Bernard Lalanne-Cassou in 2010. It is found in the Neotropics, including Guyana.

References

Moths described in 2010
zebra